Ernst Friedrich Wollweber (29 October 1898 – 3 May 1967) was a German politician who was State Secretary of State Security from 1953 to 1955 and Minister of State Security of East Germany from 1955 to 1957.

Biography
Born in Hann. Münden, Hanover, in 1898, Wollweber joined the Imperial Germany's navy, the Kaiserliche Marine, at a young age and served in the submarine department during World War I. In November 1918, Wollweber participated in the Wilhelmshaven mutiny, a high-profile sailor rebellion in Kiel, and, following the end of the German Revolution, joined the Communist Party of Germany in 1919.

Wollweber rose quickly through the party ranks and by 1921 had become a member of the KPD’s Central Committee and Political Secretary of Hesse-Waldeck. Two years later, Wollweber became a leader of the militant wings of the KPD in Hesse-Waldeck, Thuringia, and Silesia. Wollweber’s activities led to his arrest in 1924, after which time he was charged with high treason. Wollweber was released in 1926, and in 1928 he was elected a representative of the Prussian Federal State Parliament, a position he held until 1932.  In 1929, he was elected to the Federal State Parliament of Lower Silesia and from 1932 to 1933 was a representative of the Reichstag. In 1931 was he elected to the leadership of the International Union of Seamen and Harbour Workers (ISH).

When the KPD was outlawed in Germany after the Reichstag fire of February 1933, Wollweber was forced to flee to Copenhagen and later to Leningrad. From 1936 to 1940, Wollweber organized the "Organisation Against Fascism and in Support of the USSR", better known as the Wollweber League which conducted 21 known acts of sabotage against the ships of Fascist nations sailing from Scandinavian and other northern European ports. In 1937, Wollweber became a weapons supplier to the Republican side in the Spanish Civil War. A worldwide fugitive, Wollweber was finally apprehended in Sweden in 1940 when he was very nearly deported to certain death in Germany. Eventually he was sentenced to three years of imprisonment.  Because he had received Soviet citizenship while in custody, the Swedish Government in 1944 finally gave in to Soviet pressure and allowed Wollweber to leave for the USSR.

After World War II, Wollweber returned to Germany and joined the Socialist Unity Party of Germany in 1946.  A year later, he became leader of the central management for shipping and in 1950, Undersecretary of State for the Ministry of Traffic in East Germany.  Around this time, it was rumored in the West that he had established a new Wollweber Organization for the USSR, which would be teaching Communist agents in nations in Eastern Europe and along the North Sea the art of sabotage. However, these rumours have not been substantiated. While in this position, he was spied on by Walter Gramsch, who foiled several of Wollweber's attempts to smuggle products past the Western embargo into East Germany.

In June 1953, Wollweber was made Undersecretary of State for the Shipping Office, but a month later he became State Secretary of State Security (the Stasi) after Wilhelm Zaisser was removed from the post as Minister of State Security and the Stasi was downgraded to a State Secretariat. In November 1955, Wollweber was made Minister of State Security, after the Stasi had been restored to a ministry. Wollweber tried to improve the Stasi’s domestic powers in the search of what he saw as Western intelligence infiltration  of the GDR but this brought him into conflict with the mainstream in the SED party leadership, in particularly with its head Walter Ulbricht and Erich Honecker.

In 1954, Wollweber became a delegate to the Volkskammer or People's Parliament and a member of the SED’s Central Committee. After 1956, his influence began to wane when he clashed with Walter Ulbricht and Erich Honecker on issues ranging from East Germany’s policies towards Poland to an estimate of the number of anti-Communist groups within GDR. Besides, a new opposition group led by Politburo member Karl Schirdewan had formed within the SED Politburo to oppose Ulbricht's policies and Wollweber had unwisely taken Schirdewan's side.

In 1957, Wollweber was forced to resign as head of the Stasi and was succeeded by his deputy, Erich Mielke.  In 1958, Wollweber was accused of anti-SED activity and was removed from the Central Committee.  Shortly thereafter, Wollweber resigned from the Volkskammer and lived in obscurity in East Berlin eking out a living as a translator until his death in 1967.

References

Further reading
Cookridge, E. H. Gehlen: Spy of the Century. New York: Random House, 1972. 
 Flocken, Jan von and Scholz, Michael F. Ernst Wollweber. Saboteur - Minister - Unperson, Berlin: Aufbau-Verlag 1994. 
Lee, Martin A. The Beast Reawakens. New York: Little, Brown and Company, 1997. 
Payne, Ronald and Dobson, Christopher. Who's Who in Espionage. New York: St. Martin's Press, 1984. 
Whitney, Craig R. Spy Trader. New York: Times Books - Random House, 1994. 
Wolf, Markus. Man Without a Face: The Autobiography of Communism's Greatest Spymaster. New York: Times Books - Random House, 1997.

See also
Stasi
Wilhelm Zaisser

1898 births
1967 deaths
People from Hann. Münden
People from the Province of Hanover
Communist Party of Germany politicians
Members of the Central Committee of the Socialist Unity Party of Germany
Government ministers of East Germany
Members of the Reichstag of the Weimar Republic
Members of the 2nd Volkskammer
Imperial German Navy personnel of World War I
People of the German Revolution of 1918–1919
Refugees from Nazi Germany in the Soviet Union
Interwar-period spies
German people of the Spanish Civil War
Stasi officers
Recipients of the Patriotic Order of Merit in gold